Alexei Bueno (Rio de Janeiro, April 26, 1963) is a leading contemporary Brazilian poet.  As curator, he organized more than eighty exhibitions, on Fine Arts or on the History of Literature.  As editor, he published many selected or complete works of great classics of the Portuguese language, as Camões, Fernando Pessoa, Mário de Sá-Carneiro, Almada Negreiros, Gonçalves Dias, Álvares de Azevedo, Machado de Assis, Cruz e Sousa, Olavo Bilac, Alphonsus de Guimaraens, Augusto dos Anjos (a complete critical edition) and Vinicius de Moraes.

He was, between 1999 and 2002, director of INEPAC, Institute of the Cultural Heritage of Rio de Janeiro. He is member of PEN Club of Brazil.

Works 

 As escadas da torre (The stairs of the tower), 1984
 Poemas gregos (Greek poems), 1985 
 Livro de haicais (Book of haikais), 1989
 A decomposição de J. S. Bach (The decomposition of J. S. Bach), 1989
 Lucernário (Lucernarium), 1993
 Grandes poemas do Romantismo brasileiro (Great poems of the brazilian Romanticism), 1994
 A via estreita (The narrow way), 1995 - Alphonsus de Guimaraens Prize, by the National Library, and APCA Prize
 A juventude dos deuses (The youngness of the gods), 1996
 Entusiasmo (Enthusiasm), 1997
 Poemas reunidos (Collected poems), 1998 - Fernando Pessoa Prize
 Em sonho (In dream), 1999
 Antologia da poesia portuguesa contemporânea, um panorama, (Anthology of the contemporary Portuguese poetry, a survey), with Alberto da Costa e Silva, 1999
 Os resistentes (The insurgents), 2001
 Gamboa (2002), in the collection Cantos do Rio (Places of Rio)
 O patrimônio construído (The building heritage), 2002, with Augusto Carlos da Silva Teles and Lauro Cavalcanti – Jabuti Prize
 La poésie romantique brésilienne, 2002
 Glauber Rocha, mais fortes são os poderes do povo! (Glauber Rocha, strongest are the powers of the people!), 2003
 Poesia reunida (Collected poetry), 2003 - Jabuti Prize, ABL Prize
 O Brasil do século XIX na Coleção Fadel (The 19th Century Brazil in the Fadel Collection), 2004
 Antologia pornográfica (Pornographic anthology), 2004
 A árvore seca (The dry tree), 2006
 O Nordeste e a epopeia nacional (The Northeast and the national epic), 2006 – Aula Magna at the Rio Grande do Norte's University
 Uma história da poesia brasileira (A history of Brazilian poetry), 2007
 As desaparições (The disappearances), 2009
 Sergio Telles, caminhos da cor (Sergio Telles, the paths of colour), 2009
 João Tarcísio Bueno, o herói de Abetaia (João Tarcísio Bueno, the hero of Abetaia), 2010
 Lixo extraordinário (Waste Land), with Vik Muniz, 2010
 O universo de Francisco Brennand ( The universe of Francisco Brennand), 2011
 Machado, Euclides & outros monstros (Machado, Euclides & other monsters), 2012
 Cinco séculos de poesia: poemas traduzidos (Five centuries of Poetry: translated poems), 2013
 São Luís, 400 anos, Patrimônio da Humanidade (São Luís, 400 years, Humanity Heritage), 2013
 Poesia completa (Complete poems), 2013
 Palácios da Borracha, arquitetura da Belle Époque amazônica (The rubber palaces, archicteture from the Amazonian Belle Époque), 2014
 Os monumentos do Rio de Janeiro, inventário 2015 (The Rio de Janeiro monuments, 2015 inventory), 2015
 Alcoofilia, 5.000 anos de declarações de amor à bebida ('Alcohophilia, 5,000 years of love declarations to liquor), 2015
 Rio Belle Époque, álbum de imagens (Río Belle Époque, pictorial album), 2015
 Anamnese (Anamnese), 2016
 Desaparições (Disappearances), a Portuguese antology
 O poste (The stake), drama in two acts, 2018.
 Les résistants, full French translation of the poem, by Didier Lamaison, in Courage! Dix variations sur le courage et un chant de résistance. (2020)
 Decálogo indigno para os mortos de 2020 (poems about coronavirus pandemic), 2020
 O Sono dos Humildes (poems), 2021 - Candango Literature Prize and the National Library's Alphonsus de Guimaraens Prize 
 A escravidão na poesia brasileira: Do século XVII ao XXI (antology of poems about slavery in Brazil - 2022)
 A noite assediada (poems in prose - 2022)
 Rio de Janeiro en couleurs et en relief: À Travers Les Photos Du Voyage En Amerique Du Sud D'Albert Kahn (French edition), 2022,  with Delphine Allannic, Laurent Vidal and Mélanie Moreau

References

20th-century Brazilian poets
1963 births
21st-century Brazilian poets
20th-century Brazilian male writers
Living people
Writers from Rio de Janeiro (city)
Brazilian male poets